Resident Evil 5 is a 2009 video game.

RE5 may also refer to:

 Resident Evil: Retribution, the fifth film in the franchise
 Suzuki RE5, the 1970s motorcycle